Hungary competed at the 1980 Winter Olympics in Lake Placid, United States.

Medalists

Figure skating

Ice Dancing

References
Official Olympic Reports
International Olympic Committee results database
 Olympic Winter Games 1980, full results by sports-reference.com

Nations at the 1980 Winter Olympics
1980
1980 in Hungarian sport